The bar-shouldered ctenotus (Ctenotus inornatus)  is a species of skink found in the Northern Territory, Queensland, and Western Australia.

References

inornatus
Reptiles described in 1845
Taxa named by John Edward Gray